Joseph Ransdell may refer to:

 Joseph E. Ransdell (1858–1954), attorney and politician who served as a United States senator and congressman from Louisiana
 Joseph Morton Ransdell (1931–2010), professor of philosophy